Kolani or Kalani may refer to:
 Kalani, Fars
 Kolani, Lorestan
 Kolani, Sistan and Baluchestan
 Kolani, Chabahar, Sistan and Baluchestan Province